Ellen Bergman (5 January 1842 – 5 December 1921) was a Swedish musician, vocal educator and women's rights activist. She was a member of the Royal Swedish Academy of Music.

Biography
Eleonora (Ellen) Magdalena Bergman was born at Strängnäs, Sweden. In 1864, she began her education at the Royal Swedish Academy of Music (Kungliga Musikaliska Akademien) in Stockholm. She studied cello, organ, harmonic and solo singing, graduating in 1867. She also studied under German singing teacher Mathilde Marchesi. Bergman worked as a singing teacher at the Royal Seminary (Högre lärarinneseminariet) and the Royal College of Music (Kungliga Musikhögskolan) from 1868–1899. For her achievements in musical teaching, she was elected a member of the Royal Swedish Academy of Music (Kungliga Musikaliska Akademien) in 1876. Bergman's students included Sven Scholander, Selma Ek, and Dagmar Möller.

From the first half of the 1880s, Bergman was known as a leading member of the Swedish Federation (Svenska Federationen), the Swedish branch of the Ladies National Association for the Repeal of the Contagious Diseases Acts which had first been established in Great Britain during 1869 by Elizabeth Wolstenholme (1833–1918) and Josephine Butler (1828–1906). The organization worked against prostitution and particularly the abusive genital examinations of registered prostitutes. Svenska Federationen deemed the existing Swedish regulation system (Reglementeringssystemet) to be humiliating and socially stigmatizing. She was an early member of Nya Idun, a Swedish women's association, joining in 1891, and a member of the Fredrika Bremer Association.

In the early 1900s, she taught singing in the United States at the Isis Conservatory of Music in California.

She was awarded the Illis quorum in 1899.

Bergman died in Stockholm in 1921 and is buried in Norra begravningsplatsen.

References

Other sources
 Svanström, Yvonne (2007). Jansdotter Anna, Svanström Yvonne. red. ”Ellen Bergman och svenska Federationen: kvinnoemancipation och sedlighet i Sverige 1880-1900”. Sedligt, renligt, lagligt : prostitution i Norden 1880-1940 (Göteborg: Makadam): sid. 71–105.  (inb.). Libris 10628213

Further reading

1842 births
1921 deaths
Swedish women's rights activists
Members of the Royal Swedish Academy of Music
19th-century Swedish educators
Members of Nya Idun
Burials at Norra begravningsplatsen
Recipients of the Illis quorum